Hasna Sal (born 11 May 1972) is an American glass sculptor known for designing and sculpting large-scale glass sculptures and glass jewelry.

Education and early career
Sal received a diploma with distinction in journalism from the London School of Journalism before studying architecture at the Wentworth Institute of Technology in Boston, Massachusetts. She graduated with a NAAB accredited B. Arch degree magna cum laude in 2002. She then moved to Kansas to pursue a career in architecture. She also taught design at the University of Kansas to architectural engineering students. She pursued Masters in Landscape Architecture at Harvard University in 2011 but left before receiving a degree. After a decade working as an architect, she began her career in glass art.

Art career 
In 2015, Sal started her own glass sculpture and jewelry company, Glass Concepts 360, in Olathe. Her sculptures include sculptural sinks, window panels, wall sculptures, coffee tables, light fixtures, tableware and jewelry, with "Art in Living" being the theme of her work. She created a 600-pound nativity triptych, measuring 7 feet 9 inches tall, 8 feet 6 inches wide and 2 feet deep, which was freestanding and lit with LED. The nativity scene was installed at St. Catherine of Siena Parish in Kansas City. In March 2019, the Nativity Triptych was relocated to Savior Pastoral Center in Kansas City, KS.

In September 2018, Sal showcased her handmade jewelry at the New York Fashion Week in collaboration with Indian fashion designer Archana Kochhar. Sal was invited to return at the February 2019 New York Fashion Week for a solo show.

In September 2019, Sal showcased her handmade glass accessories at the New York Fashion Week at Sony Hall, NYC in collaboration with Australian fashion designer Daniel Alexander. Sal was invited to return to the February 2020 New York Fashion Week for a solo show.

In July 2020, Sal showcased thirteen wall sculptures in glass, with the pieces on display at St. Michael the Archangel Church in Leawood, Kansas. The theme of the exhibit was “human trafficking.” 

In October 2020, Sal completed a permanent exterior public art installation at Lykins Square Park in Kansas City MO, memorializing victims of human trafficking. These panels are in glass encased by metal frame. The title is "Into The Light". The installation consists of four panels which are 2 feet in width and 4 feet in height. They are placed 14 feet off ground level. The themes of the panels are isolation, damnation, redemption and salvation.

In November 2020, Sal came on board the Public Art Master Plan Core Team for Johnson County Parks and Recreation Department.

In February 2021, Sal showcased a solo online exhibition of her sculptures hosted by RG Endres Gallery, an extension of the City Hall of the city of Prairie Village in Kansas. The online exhibition is expected to continue through the month of March.

In September 2021, Sal won the new Kansas City International Airport concourse wall installation project. Sal is expected to complete installation in Fall 2022.

In October 2021, Sal received selection in an international open-call competition to present at the Larnaca Biennale in Larnaca, Cyprus. The Biennale is to showcase from 13 October to 26 November 2021.

In November 2021, Sal published her book titled Poems of Glass.

In November 2021, Sal won Neighborhood Stabilization Merit Award by Historic Kansas City for her memorial installation titled "Into the Light".|

In November 2021, Sal exhibited her Glass artwork and poetry installation titled "Into the Light" at the Westport Presbyterian Church.

In January 2022, Sal exhibited her Glass artwork and poetry installation titled "Into the Light" at the Kansas City Museum.

In February 2022, Benedictine College hosted Sal's artwork installation - "Into the Light" as part of their Social Justice Week. 

In June 2022, Sal received gallery representation with Eva Reynolds Gallery. 

In July 2022, Sal was prominently featured in a leading newspaper in Kerala for her work with glass. 

In July 2022, Sal formed a public art foundation called Hasna Sal Public Art Foundation.

In August 2022, Sal was one of the 150 artists selected from 40 nations to feature at the international competition by Biennale Chianciano in Italy.

In September 2022, Sal's installation "Helping Hand" found a permanent place at the YWCA in St Joseph.

In October 2022, Sal’s permanent exterior public art installation ‘Live in Light ‘, comprising 03 painted and lighted glass panels on steel posts were installed at Independence Plaza Park, Kansas City MO.

In November 2022, Sal's two prominent artwork installations - Lykins Park and Camaraderie which address the issue of human trafficking became part of the Kansas City Museum’s permanent collection.

In December 2022, Sal was chosen to showcase her work at the 41st Annual Smithsonian Craft Show to be held in May, 2023.

References

1971 births
Living people
People from Overland Park, Kansas
Alumni of the London School of Journalism
Wentworth Institute of Technology alumni
Harvard University alumni
American glass artists
Women glass artists
American women artists of Indian descent
American people of Malayali descent
21st-century American women